Beiyuan is a station on Line 13 of the Beijing Subway.

History
Beiyuan station opened on 28 January 2003. The installation of automatic platform gates started on 9 August 2012 and was completed in September 2012.

Station layout 
The station has an at-grade island and side platform. The outer island platform is not in service.

Exits 
There is one exit, lettered A, which is accessible.

References

Beijing Subway stations in Chaoyang District